Komsomolsk is a rural locality (a selo) and the administrative centre of Tungatarovsky Selsoviet, Uchalinsky District, Bashkortostan, Russia. The population was 433 as of 2010. There are 6 streets.

Geography 
Komsomolsk is located 45 km northeast of Uchaly (the district's administrative centre) by road. Tungatarovo is the nearest rural locality.

References 

Rural localities in Uchalinsky District